The Myanmar women's national football team is a female association football team representing Myanmar and is controlled by Myanmar Football Federation (MFF).

History
Myanmar played its first game in 1995, against the Philippines, which Myanmar drew 1–1 in the 1995 Southeast Asian Games. Since then, Myanmar, like North Korea, has received more money from the state and improved its game. 

In 2005, the country was one of seven teams that included Brunei, Thailand, Indonesia, East Timor, Malaysia, Cambodia, Laos, Vietnam, Burma and Singapore, that were expected to field a women's football team to compete at the Asian Games in Marikina in December.

Myanmar first took part in the 2003 AFC Women's Championship held in Thailand, and has since qualified five times, but Myanmar has never progressed beyond the group stage in the tournament. In the 2022 AFC Women's Asian Cup, Myanmar had come close to winning the first group game and qualify for the knockout stage for the first time, but a draw to Vietnam 2–2 after taking the lead twice put an end to that hope.

Team image

Nicknames
The Myanmar women's national football team has been known or nicknamed the "Asian Lionesses".

Home stadium
The Myanmar women's national football team plays their home matches at the Mandalarthiri Stadium.

Rivalries

FIFA World Ranking
, after the match against .

 Best Ranking   Best Mover   Worst Ranking   Worst Mover

Results and fixtures

The following is a list of match results in the last 12 months, as well as any future matches that have been scheduled.

Legend

2021

2022

2023

Coaching staff

Current coaching staff

, after the match against .

Players

Current squad
The following players were called up to the 2022 AFC Women's Asian Cup.

Caps and goals updated as of 22 September 2022, after the match against .

|-
! colspan="9"  style="background:yellow; text-align:left;"|
|- style="background:#dfedfd;"

|-
! colspan="9"  style="background:green; text-align:left;"|
|- style="background:#dfedfd;"

|-
! colspan="9"  style="background:red; text-align:left;"|
|- style="background:#dfedfd;"

Recent call-ups
The following players were named to the Myanmar squad in the last 12 months.

Caps and goals may be incorrect.

Previous squads
 AFC Women's Asian Cup
 2003 AFC Women's Championship squad
 2006 AFC Women's Asian Cup squad
 2010 AFC Women's Asian Cup squad
 2014 AFC Women's Asian Cup squad
 2022 AFC Women's Asian Cup squad

Records

Individual records

*Active players in bold, statistics correct as of February 2022.

Most capped players

Top goalscorers

Honours

Regional
 AFF Women's Championship

 Winners (2): 2004, 2007
 Runner-Up (3): 2011, 2012, 2015
 Bronze medal (3): 2016, 2019, 2022

 Southeast Asian Games

 Silver medal (3): 1997, 2003, 2005
 Bronze medal (7): 1995, 2001, 2007, 2009, 2013, 2017, 2019

Other tournaments
 Women's Gold Cup

 Winners (1): 2019

Competitive record

FIFA Women's World Cup

Olympic Games

AFC Women's Asian Cup

*Draws include knockout matches decided on penalty kicks.

Asian Games

AFF Women's Championship

*Draws include knockout matches decided on penalty kicks.

SEA Games

See also

 Myanmar Football Federation (MFF)
 Football in Myanmar
 National teams
 Myanmar women's national football team
 Myanmar women's national football team results
 Myanmar women's national under-20 football team
 Myanmar women's national under-17 football team

References

External links
Myanmar women's national football team – official website at the-mff.org 
FIFA profile

 
Asian women's national association football teams